"How do I love thee, let me count the ways" is a line from the 43rd sonnet of Sonnets from the Portuguese, a collection of 44 love sonnets written by Elizabeth Barrett Browning.

Let Me Count the Ways may also refer to:

Music 
 "Let Me Count the Ways" (Yoko Ono song), 1980 song from Milk and Honey
 "Let Me Count the Ways" (Natural song), 2002
 "Let Me Count the Ways (I Love You)", a 1976 song by The Temptations from The Temptations Do The Temptations
 "Let Me Count the Ways", a 1980 song by Tanya Tucker from Dreamlovers (album)
 "Let Me Count the Ways", a 1984 song by Steve Hackett from Till We Have Faces
 "Let Me Count the Ways", a 1996 song by Dave Koz from Off the Beaten Path

Literature 
 Let Me Count the Ways, a 1965 work by Peter De Vries
 Let Me Count the Ways, a 1988 novel by Leigh Michaels
 Let Me Count the Ways: Discovering Great Sex Without Intercourse, a 1999 book by Marty Klein
 "Let Me Count the Ways", a 2007 poem by Matthew Byrne, also appearing in The Best American Poetry 2007

Television 
 "Let Me Count the Ways", an episode of Knots Landing
 "Let Me Count the Ways", an episode of Cheers
 "Let Me Count the Ways", an episode of The Red Green Show